Tamalco is an unincorporated community in Bond County, Illinois, United States. Tamalco is located along a railroad line northwest of Keyesport.

The community was named in 1884 as a portmanteau of the names of Bond County residents W. H. Taylor, John McLaren, and Frank Colwell. Its post office opened the same year; Taylor served as the first postmaster.

References

Unincorporated communities in Bond County, Illinois
Unincorporated communities in Illinois
1884 establishments in Illinois